Body composition may be analyzed in various ways. This can be done in terms of the chemical elements present, or by molecular type e.g., water, protein, fats (or lipids), hydroxylapatite (in bones), carbohydrates (such as glycogen and glucose) and DNA. In terms of tissue type, the body may be analyzed into water, fat, connective tissue, muscle, bone, etc. In terms of cell type, the body contains hundreds of different types of cells, but notably, the largest number of cells contained in a human body (though not the largest mass of cells) are not human cells, but bacteria residing in the normal human gastrointestinal tract.

Elements

About 99% of the mass of the human body is made up of six elements: oxygen, carbon, hydrogen, nitrogen, calcium, and phosphorus. Only about 0.85% is composed of another five elements: potassium, sulfur, sodium, chlorine, and magnesium. All 11 are necessary for life. The remaining elements are trace elements, of which more than a dozen are thought on the basis of good evidence to be necessary for life. All of the mass of the trace elements put together (less than 10 grams for a human body) do not add up to the body mass of magnesium, the least common of the 11 non-trace elements.

With approx 1 kg of phosphorus, valued at around 300 USD/kg, this makes up the highest part of the body's intrinsic value.

Other elements
Not all elements which are found in the human body in trace quantities play a role in life. Some of these elements are thought to be simple common contaminants without function (examples: caesium, titanium), while many others are thought to be active toxins, depending on amount (cadmium, mercury, lead, radioactives). In humans, arsenic is toxic, and its levels in foods and dietary supplements are closely monitored to reduce or eliminate its intake.

Some elements  (silicon, boron, nickel, vanadium) are probably needed by mammals also, but in far smaller doses. Bromine is used abundantly by some (though not all) lower organisms, and opportunistically in eosinophils in humans. One study has indicated bromine to be necessary to collagen IV synthesis in humans. Fluorine is used by a number of plants to manufacture toxins but only functions in humans as a local topical hardening agent in tooth enamel.

Elemental composition list

The average  adult human body contains approximately  atoms and contains at least detectable traces of 60 chemical elements. About 29 of these elements are thought to play an active positive role in life and health in humans.

The relative amounts of each element vary by individual, mainly due to differences in the proportion of fat, muscle and bone in their body. Persons with more fat will have a higher proportion of carbon and a lower proportion of most other elements (the proportion of hydrogen will be about the same).
The numbers in the table are averages of different numbers reported by different references.

The adult human body averages ~53% water. This varies substantially by age, sex, and adiposity. In a large sample of adults of all ages and both sexes, the figure for water fraction by weight was found to be 48 ±6% for females and 58 ±8% water for males. Water is ~11% hydrogen by mass but ~67% hydrogen by atomic percent, and these numbers along with the complementary % numbers for oxygen in water, are the largest contributors to overall mass and atomic composition figures. Because of water content, the human body contains more oxygen by mass than any other element, but more hydrogen by atom-fraction than any element.

The elements listed below as "Essential in humans" are those listed by the US Food and Drug Administration as essential nutrients, as well as six additional elements: oxygen, carbon, hydrogen, and nitrogen (the fundamental building blocks of life on Earth), sulfur (essential to all cells) and cobalt (a necessary component of vitamin B12). Elements listed as "Possibly" or "Probably" essential are those cited by the National Research Council (United States) as beneficial to human health and possibly or probably essential.

*Iron = ~3 g in males, ~2.3 g in females

Of the 94 naturally occurring chemical elements, 61 are listed in the table above. Of the remaining 33, it is not known how many occur in the human body.

Most of the elements needed for life are relatively common in the Earth's crust. Aluminium, the third most common element in the Earth's crust (after oxygen and silicon), serves no function in living cells, but is toxic in large amounts, depending on its physical and chemical forms and magnitude, duration, frequency of exposure, and how it was absorbed by the human body. Transferrins can bind aluminium.

Periodic table

Molecules
The composition of the human body expressed in terms of chemicals:
Water
Proteins – including those of hair, connective tissue, etc.
Fats (or lipids)
Hydroxyapatite in bones
Carbohydrates such as glycogen and glucose
DNA
Dissolved inorganic ions such as sodium, potassium, chloride, bicarbonate, phosphate
Gases such as oxygen, carbon dioxide, nitrogen oxide, hydrogen, carbon monoxide, acetaldehyde, formaldehyde, methanethiol. These may be dissolved or present in the gases in the lungs or intestines. Ethane and pentane are produced by oxygen free radicals.
Many other small molecules, such as amino acids, fatty acids, nucleobases, nucleosides, nucleotides, vitamins, cofactors.
Free radicals such as superoxide, hydroxyl, and hydroperoxyl.
The composition of the human body can be viewed on an atomic and molecular scale as shown in this article.

The estimated gross molecular contents of a typical 20-micrometre human cell is as follows:

Tissues

Body composition can also be expressed in terms of various types of material, such as:
Muscle
Fat
Bone and teeth
Nervous tissue (Brain and nerves)
Hormones
Connective tissue
Body fluids (blood, lymph, Urine)
Contents of digestive tract, including intestinal gas
Air in lungs
Epithelium

Composition by cell type

There are many species of bacteria and other microorganisms that live on or inside the healthy human body. In fact, there are roughly as many microbial as human cells in the human body by number.

(much less by mass or volume). Some of these symbionts are necessary for our health. Those that neither help nor harm humans are called commensal organisms.

See also
List of organs of the human body
Hydrostatic weighing
Dietary element
Composition of blood
List of human blood components
Body composition
Abundance of elements in Earth's crust
Abundance of the chemical elements

References 

Biochemistry
Human anatomy
Human physiology